The 1782 Edict of Tolerance (Toleranzedikt vom 1782) was a religious reform of Emperor Joseph II during the time he was emperor of the Habsburg monarchy as part of his policy of Josephinism, a series of drastic reforms to remodel Austria in the form of the ideal Enlightened state. Joseph II's enlightened despotism included the Patent of Toleration, enacted in 1781, and the Edict of Tolerance in 1782. The Patent of Toleration granted religious freedom to the Lutherans, Calvinists, and Serbian Orthodox, but it was not until the 1782 Edict of Tolerance that Joseph II extended religious freedom to the Jewish population.

1781 Patent of Toleration

The 1781 Patent of Toleration allowed certain rights and recognized the existence of non-Catholic religions in the Habsburg Empire. The Edict of Toleration allowed Protestants from other countries where religious tolerance was not enforced to immigrate to Austria and hold jobs such as pharmacists, carpenters and blacksmiths. The tolerated religions, however, were allowed to have congregations no larger than 100 people in a private home. If a certain sect had more than 100 families living in an area, they were allowed to build a church only if the church did not have a direct entrance from the street and had no visible appearance of being a church. When it came to the case of mixed marriages, there were also laws that had to be followed: if a Catholic man had children with a non-Catholic woman, all the children would be raised Catholic. In the case of a Catholic woman with a non-Catholic man, the girls would be raised Catholic while the boys would be raised non-Catholic.

Scrutiny from Catholic officials occurred in places, like Bohemia, where the officials attempted to preserve religious unity. In order to do this they had printed out all the pamphlets that described this edict in German. The population whom this would affect, however, generally could not speak or read German.

Serbian Metropolitan Mojsije Putnik translated and published the tolerance patent in Serbian. The patent meant that there were equal rights for members of the Serbian Orthodox Church and the Catholic Church in Sremski Karlovci.

Jewish community before the Edict
Long before the Jews had been granted religious freedom by Joseph II, they were treated rather harshly by his mother, Maria Theresa and had been ostracized by others. During the Middle Ages, Austrian Jews had lived apart from the Christians and had not been allowed by the government to own immovable property. Although this was not the case for the more affluent Jews, those who were wealthy and were able to establish factories were recipients of preferential treatment by Maria Theresa, but otherwise there were restrictions on the rest of the Jewish population. Joseph II was the first one who made an attempt to eliminate these attitudes and sanctions that were toward the majority of the Jewish population.

1782 Edict of Tolerance
The 1782 Edict of Tolerance was issued on January 2, 1782. The Edict was initially put into effect in Lower Austria. The prologue to the resolution stated "This policy paper aims at making the Jewish population useful to the state." This second edict allowed Jewish children to attend schools and universities. It allowed adults to engage in jobs such as being merchants or to open factories. Jews could learn trades, but were still not allowed to become master craftsmen. The Edict did eliminate some previous restrictions, which had forced the Jews to wear gold stars or to pay a tax that was only levied on the Jews and cattle. According to the edict, however, the Jewish languages, the written language Hebrew and the spoken language Yiddish, were to be replaced by the national language of the country. Official documents and school textbooks could not be printed in Hebrew. Also immigration of new Jews into Austria was severely restricted.

References

 
 
 Mendes-Flohr, Paul and Reinharz, Jehuda, ed. The Jew in the Modern World, New York: Oxford University Press, 1995.

External links
 The Edict of Tolerance translated in English at the German Historical Institute

Edict Of Tolerance, 1782
Edict of Tolerance
Religion in the Holy Roman Empire
Jewish Austrian history
Christianity and law in the 18th century
Edicts of toleration
1782 in Christianity
Joseph II, Holy Roman Emperor